Kristen Nicole Edmonds (born May 22, 1987) is an American professional soccer player who plays for NJ/NY Gotham FC in the National Women's Soccer League (NWSL). She previously played for Stjarnan Women in Iceland, WFC Rossiyanka in Russia, and the Western New York Flash and Orlando Pride in the NWSL.

College career

Rutgers Scarlet Knights, 2005–2008
Edmonds attended Rutgers University from 2005 to 2008 where she played for the Rutgers Scarlet Knights. During her freshman season, she became the first rookie to lead the team in scoring since Carli Lloyd. Edmonds scored six goals and recorded six assists. She was named the SoccerBuzz All-Region Freshman First Team. The following season, she scored two goals and recorded one assist in the 16 games in which she played. During her senior year, she was a starter in all 22 games, scored five goals and registered six assists.

Club career

Stjarnan, 2011
In 2011, Edmonds signed with Icelandic team, Stjarnan and helped the team win the league championship and Icelandic Women's Cup.

WFC Rossiyanka, 2012–2013 
Edmonds joined WFC Rossiyanka of the Russian Premier League for the 2012–13 season. She made 13 appearances, scored two goals, and recorded seven assists. Rossiyanka finished in first place during the regular season with a  record. She made two appearances with the club in the 2012–13 UEFA Women's Champions League. During the 2013 season, Edmonds made 13 starts in 13 games and scored one goal. Rossiyanka finished in fourth place during the regular season with a  record. She made four appearances for the club in the 2013–14 UEFA Women's Champions League.

Western New York Flash, 2014–15 
Edmonds signed with the Western New York Flash in the National Women's Soccer League (NWSL) for the 2014 season. She stated in 19 of the 22 games and recorded one assist while playing in the defender position. The Flash finished the regular season in seventh place with a  record.

After returning for the 2015 season, Edmonds 10 starts in her 11 appearances for the club and recorded one assist. The club finished in seventh place with a  record.

Orlando Pride, 2016–2020 
In December 2015, Edmonds was traded to expansion team Orlando Pride. Edmonds started in all of the 19 games in which she played and scored six goals from the midfield. The team finished in ninth place with a  record during its inaugural season. She was named NWSL Player of the Week for Week 12 after scoring a brace against the Boston Breakers to lead the Pride to a 2–1 win.

Kansas City Current
On 30 January 2021, Edmonds was traded to Kansas City Current with the natural second-round pick in the 2022 NWSL Draft in exchange for Gunnhildur Yrsa Jónsdóttir and the playing rights to Erika Tymrak. After an altercation with Portland Thorns FC forward Morgan Weaver, Edmonds was suspended for two games in the 2021 NWSL Challenge Cup.

International career
On October 27, 2016, Edmonds was called up to United States women's national soccer team training camp for the first time.

Career statistics
.

Honors 
with Stjarnan
 Úrvalsdeild winner: 2011

with Rossiyanka
 Russian Women's Football Championship runners-up: 2012–13

with Orlando Pride
 NWSL Player of the Week: 2016 (week 12)

References

External links 

 Orlando Pride player profile
 Rutgers player profile
 
 

1987 births
Living people
American women's soccer players
National Women's Soccer League players
Western New York Flash players
WFC Rossiyanka players
Expatriate women's footballers in Iceland
Expatriate women's footballers in Russia
American expatriate sportspeople in Iceland
American expatriate sportspeople in Russia
Women's association football defenders
Rutgers Scarlet Knights women's soccer players
Soccer players from New Jersey
People from Metuchen, New Jersey
Sportspeople from Middlesex County, New Jersey
Orlando Pride players
Women's association football midfielders
New Jersey Wildcats players
Stjarnan women's football players
Kristen Edmonds
African-American women's soccer players
21st-century African-American sportspeople
21st-century African-American women
20th-century African-American people
20th-century African-American women
Kansas City Current players